Tarrant Hinton is a village and civil parish in the county of Dorset in southern England. In 2013 the estimated population of the civil parish was 160.

The village's name appears in medieval sources. In 935, King Æthelstan granted land at Tarrant Hinton to the nuns of Shaftesbury Abbey under condition that they would pray hard for the king.

The village no longer has a public house, shop or post office, but it has a medieval parish church and a newly rebuilt village hall. In 2001 the ecclesiastical parish of Tarrant Hinton was grouped with nine other surrounding parishes to form the Chase Benefice in the Anglican Diocese of Salisbury.

Tarrant Hinton is well known as the location of the Great Dorset Steam Fair, which is annually visited by some 200,000 people.  

There is a local church benefice newsletter published regularly called the Tarrant Times.

Governance
Tarrant Hinton parish falls under the Dorset Council ward of Hill Forts and Upper Tarrants, and the parliamentary constituency of North Dorset. The current MP (since 2015) is Simon Hoare of the Conservative Party.

References

External links

 Tarrant Hinton Village website
 Great Dorset Steam Fair official site
 BBC Steam Fair site (2005)

Villages in Dorset